The 1946 George Washington Colonials football team was an American football team that represented George Washington University as part of the Southern Conference during the 1946 college football season. In their first season under head coach Skip Stahley, the team compiled a 4–3 record (1–1 in the SoCon).

Schedule

References

George Washington
George Washington Colonials football seasons
George Washington Colonials football